The Taraises Formation is a geologic formation in northern Mexico. It preserves fossils dating back to the Early Cretaceous, including ammonites.

See also 

 List of fossiliferous stratigraphic units in Mexico

References

External links 
 

Geologic formations of Mexico
Cretaceous Mexico
Lower Cretaceous Series of North America